John Walker "Stuart" Vaughan (August 23, 1925 – June 10, 2014) was an American theatre director, manager, and producers. He was the Founding Artistic Director of the New York Shakespeare Festival, Seattle Repertory Theatre, Repertory Theatre New Orleans, The New Globe Theatre and Artistic Director of New York’s Phoenix Theatre. He also directed several productions off Broadway and for New Jersey Rep and the Riverside Shakespeare Company. He is a recipient of an Obie Award (1958) and a Drama Desk Award. He was born in Terre Haute, Indiana. He died of prostate cancer in High Bridge, New Jersey in 2014.

References

External references
 New Jersey Repertory Theater Bio of Stuart Vaughan

1925 births
2014 deaths
Indiana State University alumni
People from Terre Haute, Indiana
American theatre managers and producers
American theatre directors